Titán (born October 15, 1990) is a Mexican luchador enmascarado (or professional wrestler), who works for Consejo Mundial de Lucha Libre (CMLL). He portrays a tecnico ("Good guy") wrestling character. Titan's real name is not a matter of public record, as is often the case with masked wrestlers in Mexico where their private lives are concealed from the wrestling fans.

Titán began his in-ring career in 2008, working primarily in CMLL's local Guadalajara arena under the ring name Palacio Negro. In 2011 he began working more often in Mexico City, where he was given a new mask and the ring name "Titán". Working for CMLL has also allowed Titán to compete in the United States for Ring of Honor and in Japan for New Japan Pro-Wrestling, where he is a member of the Los Ingobernables de Japon stable, as both companies are affiliated with CMLL.

He is the current CMLL World Welterweight Champion in his first reign and the current CMLL World Tag Team Champion (with Volador Jr.) in his first reign. He is a former Mexican National Welterweight Champion, Mexican National Trios Champion with partners La Máscara and Rush and a former DTU Nexo Champion with Tritón. During his career he has won several CMLL tournaments such as the 2009 Torneo Tanque Dantes (with Guerrero Samurai II), 2012 En Busca de un Ídolo, Torneo Nacional de Parejas Increíbles (2019 Torneo Nacional de Parejas Increíbles) (with Bárbaro Cavernario) and the 2019 Reyes del Aire.

Professional wrestling career
In lucha libre it is traditional to keep the true identity of a masked wrestler a secret, not revealing their real names and occasionally not revealing what previous ring names they have competed under. At times the officially listed debut date indicates when a wrestler began wearing a specific mask and using a name, not the professional wrestling debut. In the case of Titán, it is believed that he did not work under a different name before making his 2008 debut.

Consejo Mundial de Lucha Libre (2008–present)

Palacio Negro (2008–2011)
He made his professional wrestling debut under the name "Palacio Negro" ("The Dark Palace"). Initially he worked in Guadalajara, Jalisco, home of one of Consejo Mundial de Lucha Libre's main wrestling schools. In 2009 Palacio Negro teamed up with Guerrero Samurai to participate in a locally promoted Torneo Tanque Dantes ("The Tank Dantes Tournament") in honor of Alfonso "Tank" Dantés. The duo won four matches in total and lost only one, which was enough to win the tournament. CMLL indicated that they had plans for Palacio Negro and wanted to move him up the ranks of the promotion when he was booked to win an eight-man Infierno en el Ring steel cage match, earning the rings to remove Azrael's mask as per the Lucha de Apuestas ("Bet match") stipulation. The cage match also include a wrestler who would be his future tag team partner, Metal Blancomid. Palacio Negro remained in Guadalajara for most of 2009, gaining more in-ring experience and continuing to train under Gran Cochisse and El Satánico. Palacio Negro lost a challenge to win the Occidente Welterweight Championship by the eventual champion Ángel del Mal; he would later be unsuccessful in a title match against Ángel del Mal.

By the end of 2010 Palacio Negro, along with Metal Blanco, made his wrestling debut in Mexico City, appearing at CMLL's primary venue Arena Mexico. The duo teamed up with Sagrado in a tournament to determine the number one contenders for the Mexican National Trios Championship. The team was successful, advancing to the final by defeating Los Guerreros Tuareg (Arkangel de la Muerte, Loco Max and Skándalo) and Los Cancerberos del Infierno (Euforia, Nosferatu and Pólvora). In the final the team lost to Ángel de Oro, Diamante and Rush, who would go on to win the championship. Palacio Negro was paired up with the veteran Averno to participate in the 2011 Gran Alternativa tournament, where a rookie and a veteran teams up. The team defeated Black Warrior and Lestat in the first round and the team of Negro Casas and Puma King in the quarter finals. The team lost to Máscara Dorada and Metal Blanco in the semi-final match. Following the Gran Alternativa tournament Palacio Negro was entered in CMLL's Forjando un Ídolo ("Forging an Idol") tournament along with a number of other young wrestlers, all trying to make a name for themselves. Palacio defeated Rey Cometa but lost to Ángel de Oro and Rey Escorpión, only earning three points in the tournament, not enough to advance out of the preliminary round. In late 2011 Palacio Negro entered CMLL's most prestigious annual tournament the Leyenda de Plata ("Silver Legend"). He was eliminated by his longtime tag team partner Metal Blanco early in the match. On September 30, 2011 Palacio Negro was one of 14 men putting their mask or hair on the line in an Infierno en el Ring steel cage match, the match (which also included Metal Blanco, Toscano, Guerrero Maya, Jr., Ángel de Plata, Delta, Okumura, Leono, Yoshihashi, Leo, Maléfico, Sagrado and Pólvora) ended when Palacio Negro pinned Loco Max, forcing Max to be shaved bald after the match.

Titán (2011–present)
Palacio Negro and Metal Blanco stopped appearing in Mexico City in early November 2011 in preparation for being repackaged with new masks and ring names. The two were reintroduced as Titán (Palacio Negro) and Tritón (Metal Blanco), presented as new versions of characters used in the early 1990s in CMLL. The two were teamed up with Shocker, backing him up in a storyline feud against Atlantis, Guerrero Maya Jr., and Delta, collectively known as Los Reyes de la Atlantida ("The Kings of the Atlantis"). Metro was originally announced as part of the group, but did not appear with the team outside of a press conference. The storyline with Los Reyes was dropped a few weeks later when Shocker was taken off the shows for personal reasons. Titán took part in the 2012 Reyes del Aire tournament, but was eliminated as the fourth out of 18 wrestlers.

CMLL held a Torneo Sangre Nueva ("New Blood Tournament"), similar in concept of the Forjando un Ídolo tournament, and Titán was the last man eliminated by eventual tournament winner Dragon Lee. He teamed with Máscara Dorada but lost in the first round to eventual tournament winners El Terrible and Euforia. After being unsuccessful in both the Forjando un Ídolo and the Sangre Nueva tournaments  Titán entered CMLL's En Busca de un Ídolo ("In search of an Idol"). The tournament used a point system that allowed fans to vote online, allowing Titán to advance to the second round despite only winning one of his four first round matches. The fan support propelled Titán to the final, where he defeated Euforia to claim his first major victory. As part of his reward for winning the tournament he was given a title match for the CMLL World Middleweight Championship against Dragón Rojo Jr. on the July 21 Super Viernes Show, in which he was unsuccessful. Titán would later defeat En Busca de un Ídolo rival Pólvora to win the Mexican National Welterweight Championship Another prize that Titán earned by winning the En Busca de un Ídolo tournament was to wrestle on all three 2013 Fantastica Mania shows, an annual series of shows held in Japan and co-promoted with New Japan Pro-Wrestling (NJPW).  In early 2013 Titán suffered a herniated disc during a match, an injury that forced CMLL to vacate the Welterweight Championship on March 20.

On June 30, Titán, La Máscara, and Rush defeated Los Invasores (Kráneo, Mr. Águila and Psicosis) to win the Mexican National Trios Championship. On December 1, 2013, Titán regained the Mexican National Welterweight Championship from Averno. For the 2013/2014 Leyenda de Plata tournament, Titán outlasted Atlantis, Averno, La Máscara, Olímpico, Delta, El Felino, Tritón, Tiger, Stuka Jr., Okumura, and Virus to qualify for the final. Two weeks later, on January 4, 2014, Negro Casas defeated him in the final of the tournament. On February 18, Titán, La Máscara and Rush lost the Mexican National Trios Championship to La Peste Negra (El Felino, Mr. Niebla and Negro Casas).

Titán and Bárbaro Cavernario were paired up for the 2015 Torneo Nacional de Parejas Increíbles ("Inicredible teams tournament) as part of an ongoing storyline rivalry between the two over the Mexican National Welterweight Championship. The team lost to Rey Bucanero and Volador Jr. in the first round. Two months later, Titán lost the Mexican National Welterweight Championship to Bárbaro Cavernario. In December 2015 he unsuccessfully challenged Dragón Rojo Jr. for the CMLL World Middleweight Championship, losing two falls to one. In 2018, Titán began to team with his old partner Tritón and Esfinge, forming a trio known as La Excelencia Tapatia ("Masked excellence") and later as "One Atos". The trio unsuccessfully challenged La Nuev a Generación Dinamita (Sansón, Cuatrero and Forastero) for the Mexican National Trios Championship in April 2018.

Titán began 2019 by outlasting 15 wrestlers to win that year's Reyes del Aire ("Kings of the Air") tournament. For the 2019 Torneo Nacional de Parejas Increíbles, CMLL paired Titán with long time rival Bárbaro Cavernario as they had done for the 2015 and 2018 tournaments. The rivals decided to put their differences aside for the tournament, opting to wear ring gear that was a combination of both of their normal wrestling gear. The duo defeated Blue Panther and Máscara Año 2000 in the first round, Soberano Jr.  and Sansón in the quarter final, Carístico and Mephisto in the semi-finals, and Volador Jr. and Último Guerrero to win the tournament. In October 2019, Titán was teamed up with rookie Súper Astro Jr. for the 2019 Gran Alternativa tournament. They defeated Negro Casas and Yago in the first round, before they lost to Bárbaro Cavernario and Espanto Jr. in the second round. On December 3, 2019 Titán and Soberano Jr. outlasted Audaz, Negro Casas, Drone, Fuego, Fugaz, Dulce Gardenia, Rey Cometa, Star Jr., Stigma, and Templario to qualify for a match for the vacant CMLL World Welterweight Championship the following week. Titán defeated Sobreano Jr. two falls to one, to become the 34th CMLL World Welterweight Champion.

New Japan Pro-Wrestling (2013–present)
As a result of winning the 2012 En Busca de un Ídolo, Titán participated in his first Japanese tour as part of the 2013 Fantastica Mania tour. During the tour Titán worked with, and against NJPW wrestlers such as Tama Tonga, Jushin Thunder Liger, Tiger Mask, Bushi, and Ishii. He returned to NJPW later that year as the sole Mexican participant in NJPW's Best of the Super Juniors tournament (BOSJ) based on his performance during the Fantastica Mania tour. Titán ended up winning three of his eight matches in the tournament, finishing the tournament with six points.

From January 14 to 19, 2014, Titán took part in his second Fantastica Mania tour with New Japan Pro-Wrestling, working mostly undercard matches. Titán unsuccessfully challenged Cavernario for the Mexican National Welterweight Champion on January 22, 2016, during the Fantastica Mania 2016 tour. Titán returned to NJPW on July 20 to take part in the 2016 Super J-Cup, losing to Will Ospreay in his first round match. Titan, along with Angel de Oro, returned to New Japan Pro-Wrestling on October 21 at Road to Power Struggle event where they took part in 2016 Super Jr. Tag Tournament. They were eliminated in the first round by Roppongi Vice.

He returned to Japan to work the 2017 Fantastica Mania tour, and was later invited to work both days of NJPW's "G1 Special in USA" tour on July 1 and 2, losing to and then defeating Los Ingobernables de Japón with various partners. He toured with NJPW from September 10 through November 5 as part of their "Road to Power Struggle" tour. As part of the tour Titán teamed up with Dragon Lee to participate in the 2017 Super Junior Tag tournament, losing in the first round to Los Ingobernables de Japón (BUSHI and Hiromu Takahashi). He ended the tour on November 5, with Titán and Dragon Lee losing to The Young Bucks (Matt Jackson and Nick Jackson) at NJPW's Power Struggle ppv.

In 2019 he returned for the Fantastica Mania tour, capping off the tour with an unsuccessful challenge for the Mexican National Trios Championship as he, Atlantis and Ángel de Oro lost to La Nueva Generación Dinamita (Sansón, El Cuatrero and Forastero). He spent all of May working in Japan, participating in the 26th Best of the Super Juniors tournament. He earned a total of six points in the tournament with victories over Taka Michinoku, Tiger Mask, and Yoshinobu Kanemaru, before losing the remaining tournament matches and ended up seventh in his block. He was invited back for the 2019 version of the Super Junior Tag League alongside Volador Jr. The team earned eight points, to finish in fourth place in the tournament. The two defeated the teams of El Desperado and Kanemaru, Ryusuke Taguchi and Rocky Romero, Tiger Mask and Yuya Uemura, TJP and Clark Connors.

On May 1, 2022, Titán was announced to be participating in the 29th annual Best of the Super Juniors tournament as a part of the B-Block. He finished with a record of 4 wins and 5 losses, ending in 8 points, therefore failing to advance to the finals. On the final day of the tournament, Titán teamed with Clark Connors, YOH and Robbie Eagles, in a losing effort to Wheeler Yuta, El Lindaman, Ace Austin and Alex Zayne.

At Declaration of Power on October 10th 2022, Titán returned to NJPW under a mask, aiding Los Ingobernables de Japon in a tag-team match against United Empire. After the match, Titán revealed himself and requested to join LIJ. The stable accepted Titán into the group, where he became the first full-time non-Japanese member.

Ring of Honor (2017–2018)
In August 2017 Titán participated in the CMLL/NJPW/Ring of Honor/RevPro-promoted War of the Worlds UK tour, replacing an injured Atlantis as a CMLL representative, making his debut for both Ring of Honor and in England. On the first night he unsuccessfully challenged Kushida for the ROH World Television Championship, followed by losses on nights two and three as well. For the December 2017 ROH PPV Final Battle, Titán teamed up with Dragon Lee and Flip Gordon to unsuccessfully challenge Bullet Club (Adam Page, Matt Jackson and Nick Jackson) for the ROH World Six-Man Tag Team Championship. The following day The Young Bucks defeated The Best Friends (Beretta and Chuckie T) and Dragon Lee/Titán at a ROH Television taping event on December 16, 2017. In 2018 he returned to ROH for one night, losing to Cody as part of ROH's television taping on June 6.

The name Titán in lucha libre
Several luchadors have used the name Titán in lucha libre in addition to the current CMLL wrestler:
Fishman – used the ring name in 1970 and 1971.
Máscara Año 2000 – used the name in 1977 before adopting his more well known moniker.
Jack Victory – the first man to work as Titán in CMLL.
Comando Ruso – took over the name and mask in CMLL, from 1992 to 1994.

Championships and accomplishments
Consejo Mundial de Lucha Libre
CMLL World Welterweight Championship (1 time, current)
CMLL World Tag Team Championship (1 time) – with Volador Jr.(1)
Mexican National Trios Championship (1 time) – La Máscara and Rush
Mexican National Welterweight Championship (2 times)
Occidente Middleweight Championship (1 time)
En Busca de un Ídolo (2012)
Reyes del Aire (2019)
Torneo Nacional de Parejas Increíbles (2019) – with Bárbaro Cavernario
Torneo Tanque Dantes (2009) – with Guerrero Samurai II
Desastre Total Ultraviolento
DTU Nexo Championship (1 time) – with Tritón
Pro Wrestling Illustrated
Ranked No. 88 of the top 500 singles wrestlers in the PWI 500 in 2022

Luchas de Apuestas record

Notes

References

1990 births
Living people
Masked wrestlers
Mexican male professional wrestlers
Professional wrestlers from Jalisco
People from Guadalajara, Jalisco
Unidentified wrestlers
21st-century professional wrestlers
Mexican National Trios Champions
CMLL World Tag Team Champions
CMLL World Welterweight Champions
Mexican National Welterweight Champions